Otero County is a county located in the U.S. state of Colorado. As of the 2020 census, the population was 18,690. The county seat is La Junta. The county was named for Miguel Antonio Otero, one of the founders of the town of La Junta and a member of a prominent Hispanic family.

Geography

Adjacent counties
Crowley County - north
Kiowa County - northeast
Bent County - east
Las Animas County - south
Pueblo County - west

Major Highways
  U.S. Highway 50
  U.S. Highway 350
  State Highway 10
  State Highway 71
  State Highway 109
  State Highway 167
  State Highway 207
  State Highway 266

National protected areas
Bent's Old Fort National Historic Site
Comanche National Grassland
Santa Fe National Historic Trail

Trails and byways
American Discovery Trail
Santa Fe Trail National Scenic Byway

Demographics

At the 2000 census there were 20,311 people, 7,920 households, and 5,472 families living in the county.  The population density was 16 people per square mile (6/km2).  There were 8,813 housing units at an average density of 7 per square mile (3/km2).  The racial makeup of the county was 79.02% White, 0.76% Black or African American, 1.43% Native American, 0.70% Asian, 0.08% Pacific Islander, 15.06% from other races, and 2.96% from two or more races.  37.62% of the population were Hispanic or Latino of any race.
Of the 7,920 households 32.20% had children under the age of 18 living with them, 52.70% were married couples living together, 12.00% had a female householder with no husband present, and 30.90% were non-families. 27.80% of households were one person and 12.90% were one person aged 65 or older.  The average household size was 2.49 and the average family size was 3.04.

The age distribution was 26.90% under the age of 18, 8.90% from 18 to 24, 24.40% from 25 to 44, 23.40% from 45 to 64, and 16.50% 65 or older.  The median age was 38 years. For every 100 females there were 95.60 males.  For every 100 females age 18 and over, there were 91.50 males.

The median household income was $29,738 and the median family income  was $35,906. Males had a median income of $26,996 versus $21,001 for females. The per capita income for the county was $15,113.  About 14.20% of families and 18.80% of the population were below the poverty line, including 25.90% of those under age 18 and 11.80% of those age 65 or over.

Politics
Otero is a strongly Republican county, although less so than the counties of the Colorado High Plains. It was last won for the Democratic Party by Bill Clinton in 1996. Before that, Otero tended to be a Republican-leaning county at the Presidential level, although it did vote for Wilson twice, FDR in 1932 and 1936, Truman in 1948 and Lyndon Johnson in 1964.

Communities

City
La Junta
Rocky Ford

Towns
Cheraw
Fowler
Manzanola
Swink

Census-designated places
La Junta Gardens
North La Junta

See also

Index of Colorado-related articles
G.W. Swink, pioneer county commissioner
List of counties in Colorado
National Register of Historic Places listings in Otero County, Colorado
Outline of Colorado

References

External links
Otero County Homepage
Colorado County Evolution by Don Stanwyck

 

 
Colorado counties
1889 establishments in Colorado
Eastern Plains
Populated places established in 1889